KNAS (105.5 FM) is a radio station broadcasting a classic country format. It is licensed to Nashville, Arkansas, United States. The station is currently owned by Arklatex Radio.

References

External links
 Official Website
 

Classic country radio stations in the United States
NAS
Radio stations established in 1977
1977 establishments in Arkansas
Nashville, Arkansas